Statistics of American Soccer League in season 1928–29.

Overview
The first half of the 1928-29 season began on September 1, 1928.  This season saw the onset of the Soccer War., a struggle between the American Soccer League and the United States Football Association for control of the sport.  It began when the league boycotted the National Challenge Cup in September 1928.  Within a week, three ASL teams, Bethlehem Steel, Newark Skeeters and New York Giants, defied the boycott and entered the cup.  On September 24, 1928, Bill Cunningham, president of the American Soccer League, suspended the three teams and fined them each $1000.00.  In response, the USFA helped create a competing league, the Eastern Professional Soccer League which included the three teams suspended by the ASL, as well as teams from the Southern New York Soccer Association and the newly created New York Hakoah.  In a bizarre twist, the first half of the season ended for some teams as early as December 25, 1928, and for others as late as January 13, 1929.  The second half of the season then began on December 29, 1928, for some team and for other, not until January 5 or January 13, 1929.  This created a situation in which some teams were still playing first half games while other teams were playing their second half games.

In December 1928, the league admitted Jersey City as the league's ninth team for the second season.  Jersey City made it seven games into the second half before withdrawing from the league and disbanding.  Then on March 23, 1929, J&P Coats also withdrew from the league following its victory over Brooklyn that day.  The team came under new ownership which renamed it the Pawtucket Rangers and re-entered the league, taking J&P Coats' record and position in the standings.  The team played its first game, a 2-1 loss to Fall River on March 30, 1929.  The league had one last team withdrew when the New Bedford Whalers left the league and jumped to the Eastern Professional Soccer League after its 4-0 victory over Boston on March 17, 1929.  The Fall River Marksmen topped the standings in both the first and second half of the season and were declared league champion.

League standings
 Percentage is a percentage of games won to games played.

First half

Second half

League Cup
The winners of the League Cup final were awarded the H.E. Lewis Cup. The finalist were tied on aggregate goals (4 each) after their two match series, and so were required to play a third winner take all match at a neutral site, Hawthorne Field in Brooklyn.

Bracket

Semifinals

New Bedford advances, 4–3, on aggregate.

New York advances, 8–7, on aggregate.

Final

New York wins Lewis Cup, 8–6, on aggregate.

Goals leaders

External links
The Year in American Soccer - 1929

References

American Soccer League (1921–1933) seasons
American